Fareed Parbati, born  Ghulam Nabi Bhat on 4 August 1961 died 14 December 2011, was an Indian Urdu language poet and writer from Jammu and Kashmir, India. He has written many books including poetry. He wrote in the form of poetry ghazal and Ruba'i. He was honoured with several awards including award by Academy of Art, Culture and Languages to recognise his literary work.

Personal life
Parbati was born on 4 August 1961 in Kashmir. He received his graduation in commerce from Islamia College of Science and Commerce. He obtained his M.A, and M.Phil degrees from University of Kashmir. He also received PhD in Urdu from Kashmir University in 1995. After his study he served in Kashmir Accounts Services. Later he joined as the Assistant Professor at the Department of Urdu, University of Kashmir from 2001 to 2006. He also served as Associate Professor at Iqbal Institute of Culture and Philosophy (IICP) from 2006 till his death.

Literary career
Parbati has written 14 books including eight poetry collections and others on criticism. His best work is on "Urdu Ruba't" that is widely appreciated. His interested form of poetry was classical Ruba'i and ghazal, he has also good knowledge of the poetry metre. He has received awards by several Institutions including Academy of Art, Culture and Languages. Parbati was acclaimed poet and writer. He was also ranked among the best writers in Urdu language.. He attended several prominent universities of the country to deliver lectures on Urdu literature.

Awards
Academy of Art, Culture and Languages.

Bibliography

Aabi-Neesaan   1992
Isbaat  1997
 Farid Nama   2003
 Guftgoo Chaand Se   2005
 Hazaar Imkaan  (poetic collection) 2006
 Khbari Tahayur   2007
 Hajoom-I-Aaina    2010  *  Hazaar Imkaan   Kulyaat (collection) 2011

See also
List of Urdu language poets

References

External links
Urdu poet & critic Dr. Fareed Parbati passes away
Dr. Fareed Parbati Recalling The Actual Of Rubayi 
KU fraternity condoles demise of Dr Fareed Parbati
Fareed Parbati – True to Tradition
Urdu department pays tributes to Parbati
Omar condoles demise of Fareed Parbati

1961 births
2011 deaths
Kashmiri poets
Kashmiri writers
Kashmiri people
University of Kashmir alumni
Urdu-language poets
20th-century Indian poets